Caledonian Thistle F.C. made their Scottish Football League debut in the Scottish Third Division in season 1994–95. They also competed in the Scottish League Cup, the Scottish Challenge Cup and Scottish Cup.

Results

Friendlies

Scottish Third Division

Final League table

Scottish League Cup

Scottish Challenge Cup

Scottish Cup

Hat-tricks

References

Inverness Caledonian Thistle F.C. seasons
Caledonian Thistle